The 1945 Marquette Hilltoppers football team was an American football team that represented Marquette University during the 1945 college football season. In its fifth season under head coach Tom Stidham, the team compiled a 5–4–1 record and outscored opponents by a total of 238 to 156. The team played its home games at Marquette Stadium in Milwaukee.

Schedule

References

Marquette
Marquette Golden Avalanche football seasons
Marquette Golden Avalanche football